Matilda McCrear (c. 1857 – January 1940) was the last known living survivor in the United States of the transatlantic slave trade and the ship Clotilda. She was a Yoruba who was captured and brought to Mobile, Mobile County, Alabama, at the age of two with her mother and older sister.

The girls were sold away from their mother and never reunited. Together with other American slaves in Union-occupied territory in the South, Matilda was granted freedom by the Emancipation Proclamation of 1863. She and her family did not achieve freedom until after the de jure abolition of slavery in 1865. She continued to be a sharecropper as an adult, and had a family of fourteen children with a white German-born American common-law husband. She died in Selma, Alabama.

McCrear's life became publicly known through research by Hannah Durkin of Newcastle University, published in 2020.

Life
McCrear was captured as a young child in West Africa with her mother and sister by the army of the West African kingdom of Dahomey, which had attacked their home.  The Dahomeyans transported their prisoners to Ouidah, a coastal port for slave trading. Captain William Foster of the Clotilda,  the last known slave ship to have carried captives from Africa to the United States, later arrived in Ouidah and transported 110 enslaved Africans including McCrear to the United States illegally (the U.S. prohibited the Atlantic slave trade in 1808 with the Act Prohibiting Importation of Slaves).

Writing in his journal in 1860, Foster described how he came into possession of the enslaved Africans on his ship:  She was a member of the Yoruba people. She received traditional facial scars, which were visible for the rest of her life. When she was two years old, she and her mother Gracie and sister Sallie (as they were named in the US), were captured and bought by a planter, Memorable Creagh. They were among more than 100 Africans transported in 1860 on the Clotilda. She had two other sisters whose names are not known, and a stepfather Guy. The girls were later sold apart from their mother and never reunited.

After the abolition of slavery in 1865, McCrear (who first took the surname of Creagh) continued to work as a sharecropper in Alabama with her mother and sister. She never married but, according to her grandson, had 14 children with a white German-born man. She changed her name from Creagh to McCrear.

In her seventies, she made a legal claim for compensation for her enslavement, which was dismissed. According to Durkin, she appears to have continued to have worn her hair in a traditional Yoruba style all her life. She died in Selma, Dallas County, Alabama, aged 83.

Prior to the publication of Durkin's research in 2020, McCrear's contemporary Redoshi (c. 1848 – 1937) was thought to be the last living survivor of the Clotilda and of the transatlantic slave trade.

References

See also
 List of the last surviving American slaves

1850s births
1940 deaths
Year of birth uncertain
American people of Yoruba descent
People with acquired American citizenship
19th-century African-American women
20th-century African-American women
20th-century African-American people
19th-century American slaves
Yoruba women
American former slaves